Mário Jacko (born 1 November 1996, in Lipany) is a Slovak football centre back who currently plays for Odeva Lipany.

Mário is a cousin of Patrik Jacko who plays for Pohronie.

References

External links
 
 Eurofotbal.cz profile

1996 births
Association football defenders
Living people
Slovak footballers
Partizán Bardejov players
FK Pohronie players
ŠK Odeva Lipany players
Slovak Super Liga players
Sportspeople from Prešov
2. Liga (Slovakia) players
3. Liga (Slovakia) players